The Battle of Kraaipan was the first engagement of the Second Anglo-Boer War, fought at Kraaipan, South Africa on 12 October 1899.

On the 11 October 1899 President Paul Kruger of the South African Republic in alliance with the Orange Free State declared war on the British. Thus began the Second Anglo-Boer War. Under the orders of Cronjé the Mafeking railway and telegraph lines were cut on the same day.

The armoured train, "Mosquito", carrying two 7-pounder cannons, rifles, ammunition and supplies was derailed and after a five-hour fight the British surrendered the next morning. The cannons, rifles, ammunition, supplies and prisoners were taken. The Boer troops discovered British Mark IV ammunition (better known as dumdum) on the train.

This incident made De la Rey famous, but exacerbated his conflicts with the cautious and unimaginative Cronjé, who sent him to block the advance of the British forces moving to relieve the Siege of Kimberley in the north-east of the Cape Colony.

References

Kraaipan
Kraaipan
Kraaipan
1899 in South Africa
October 1899 events